Sun Rise Above, also known as Sun R. A., is a hip hop artist, notable for his leftist political views and corresponding lyrics. Described as a "highly politicized rapper who manages to convey his ideological leanings in an approachable fashion", Sun Rise Above has been compared to acts like Public Enemy and the Wu-Tang Clan, as well as contemporary political rappers such as Dead Prez and Immortal Technique.

Sun Rise Above released his debut album Global Warning in 2003. In 2005, Paris signed Sun R.A. to his Guerrilla Funk imprint and an appearance on political hip hop compilation Paris Presents: Hard Truth Soldiers Vol.1 followed.
Solo album Prisoners of War (recorded 2004), originally scheduled for release through Guerrilla Funk, was eventually released independently in 2009. A single from the album, "Free Your Mind," was released on vinyl by Finnish record label Traveller Records.

Despite a lack of mainstream attention, Sun Rise Above has received press coverage internationally. Critically acclaimed album  Every Day I Wake Up On The Wrong Side Of Capitalism was released on July 2, 2011.

Discography

Albums
2003 - Global Warning
2005 - This Means War
2005 - United Front 
2006 - Paris presents Hard Truth Soldiers, Vol. 1 (featured on "Throwyahandzup" with Dead Prez and T-K.A.S.H.)
2009 - Prisoners of War
2009 - 48 Hours Toward A Better World
2011 - Every Day I Wake Up On The Wrong Side Of Capitalism
2011 - More Fucking Life
2011 - Forward Motion
2011 - Still Prisoners of War
2012 - Cultural Revolution
2012 - Nuclear Man
2021 - Revolutionary Warfare

Singles/EPs
2007 - "Free Your Mind"/"Stop"
2011 - Enero EP

References

External links
Bandcamp
Myspace

Year of birth missing (living people)
Living people
American rappers
Political music artists
Underground rappers
American socialists
21st-century American rappers